The giant kingbird (Tyrannus cubensis) is a species of bird in the tyrant flycatcher family Tyrannidae endemic to Cuba.

Taxonomy
The species is probably mostly closely related to the loggerhead kingbird, which also occurs in Cuba as well as several other nearby Caribbean islands.

Description
While this species has been reported in the past to average only 23 cm (9 in) long,  this may be excessively conservative with the overall length being .

Distribution and habitat

T. cubensis is endemic to Cuba, but is considered extirpated from the Turks and Caicos Islands and The Bahamas. Vagrant individuals have been sighted in Mexico and Hispaniola (Haiti). The giant kingbird is found in tall lowland forest. In particular, it favors pine forests and the wooded borders of waterways. It is also found in mixed pine barrens, open woodlands, swamps and savanna. It has also been seen in cloud forest.

It is threatened by habitat loss.

References

External links

BirdLife Species Factsheet.

giant kingbird
Endemic birds of Cuba
giant kingbird
giant kingbird
Taxonomy articles created by Polbot